Hypsotropa ichorella is a species of snout moth in the genus Hypsotropa. It was described by Julius Lederer in 1855. It is found in Syria and Turkey.

References

Moths described in 1855
Anerastiini
Insects of Turkey